Colleagues is a 1962 Soviet drama film directed by Aleksey Sakharov.

Plot 
The film tells about three completely different, but close to each other graduates of the Leningrad Medical Institute, who will have to cope with all the difficulties of life, to preserve their ideals and friendship.

Cast 
 Vasily Livanov as Sasha Zelenin
 Vasily Lanovoy as Aleksey Maksimov
 Oleg Anofriyev as Vladka Karpov
 Nina Shatskaya as Inna
 Tamara Syomina as Dasha Guryanova
 Rostislav Plyatt as Dampfer
 Vladimir Kashpur as Sergei Yegorov
 Vladimir Maruta as Makar Ivanovich

References

External links 
 

1962 films
1960s Russian-language films
Soviet drama films
1962 drama films